József Nagy (born 14 July 1953) is a Hungarian boxer. He competed in the men's light welterweight event at the 1976 Summer Olympics.

References

External links
 

1953 births
Living people
Hungarian male boxers
Olympic boxers of Hungary
Boxers at the 1976 Summer Olympics
Sportspeople from Szabolcs-Szatmár-Bereg County
Light-welterweight boxers